Hesar Mehtar (also Romanized as Ḩeşār Mehtar; also known as Ḩeşār) is a village in Karimabad Rural District, Sharifabad District, Pakdasht County, Tehran Province, Iran. At the 2006 census, its population was 226, in 57 families.

References 

Populated places in Pakdasht County